The Route 10 bridge, also known as Bennett's Meadow Bridge is a  steel stringer bridge crossing the Connecticut River in the town of Northfield, Massachusetts. The bridge carries state highway Route 10 and was built in 1969.

History 
The town of Northfield first authorized a bridge at or near the site of the current bridge in 1810. The bridge was built by a private corporation with the town holding stock. The new bridge was destroyed in a flood after only a few years. A horse boat ferry, known as Bennett's Meadow Ferry, replaced the river crossing. In 1897, the state legislature authorized Franklin County to construct a second bridge at or near the site of the ferry at a cost not to exceed $35,000. The new bridge was designed by Edward Shaw of Boston and was opened to traffic in 1899. The bridge was one of the first bridges erected by a then novel method without the use of false works that has since become standard procedure. The 1899 bridge was later demolished and a third bridge (the current bridge) was constructed just south of the former bridge, resulting also in the slight realignment of the highway.

See also 
List of crossings of the Connecticut River

References 
 Bridge Inventory Record on NationalBridges.com.

External links 
 HAER report on Schell Bridge, August 1990, which also talks quite a bit about this bridge

Footnotes 

Bridges over the Connecticut River
Bridges completed in 1969
Bridges in Franklin County, Massachusetts
Road bridges in Massachusetts
1969 establishments in Massachusetts
Steel bridges in the United States
Girder bridges in the United States